Fenelon is an extinct town in Elko County, in the U.S. state of Nevada. The GNIS classifies it as a populated place.

History
The name "Fenelon" was assigned by railroad officials. A variant name was "Otego". Fenelon had ten inhabitants in 1941.

References

Ghost towns in Elko County, Nevada